Democratic Network (RED Democratico, RED) is a progressive, green political party in Aruba. Since the 2017 Aruban general election it has one seat in the Estates of Aruba and is part of the government coalition under Prime Minister Evelyn Wever-Croes.

History
 founded the party.

During the 2005 Aruban general election the party obtained 3330 votes which was sufficient for 1 out of 21 seats. In 2009 and 2013 it participated but did not obtain a seat.

For the 2017 Aruban general election Ricardo Croes was the party list leader. Party founder Lampe was number two on the list. The party obtained 4166 votes and thus one seat in the Estates of Aruba. The party subsequently became part of the government coalition led by Prime Minister Evelyn Wever-Croes. Lampe joined the cabinet as specialist Minister of Education, Science and Sustainable Development and resigned his party membership to do so.

References

Political parties in Aruba